Pamela Großer  (born June 11, 1977) is a German actress, singer and TV host.

Personal life 

Großer is married and has three children.

Career

Neues vom Süderhof 

When she was a teenager, Pamela landed the role of Manuela "Molle" Brendel in the TV show Neues vom Süderhof. This role lasted from 1991 to 1993. Although she played Molle in the first 2 seasons, Neues vom Süderhof changed almost the entire cast of actors for season 3, 4 and 5. Cora Sabrina Grimm took over the role of Molle.

Tigerenten Club 

Großer continued to work for the ARD for 10 years. From 1998 to 2007, Pamela was a TV presenter on the children's game and entertainment show, the Tigerenten Club.

Kaffee oder Tee 

In 2010, Großer worked as a host for the SWR TV show Kaffee oder Tee.

Singing 
Großer also briefly pursued a singing career. In 1997 her single Erste Liebe ("First love") was released under the artist name "elá". In 2002, together with a children's choir, she released an album entitled Die Welt steht Kopf ("The World Is Upside Down").

Filmography 
List of films Pamela has worked in:

 Warnung aus dem Käfig
 Großstadtrevier (NDR)
 1991–1983: Neues vom Süderhof (ARD)
 Kartoffeln mit Stippe (ZDF)
 Immenhof (ZDF)
 Polizeiruf 110 (ARD)
 WissQuiz (WDR)
 1996: Unter einem Dach

References

External links 

 Pamela Großer Imdb page

Neues vom Suderhof
German television actresses
1977 births
Living people